Athletic Ground or Athletic Grounds may refer to:

Athletic Ground (Scarborough), demolished football stadium formerly known as the McCain Stadium in Scarborough, England.
Athletic Grounds, Gaelic Athletic Association stadium in Armagh, Northern Ireland.
The Athletic Grounds, the third and now demolished stadia of Millwall Football Club in East London, England.
Athletic Ground, Richmond, stadium in Richmond, England
Athletic Ground (Aberdare), demolished stadium in Aberdare, Wales
Athletic Ground (Cobridge), demolished stadium in Stoke-on-Trent, England
Athletic Ground (Loughborough), demolished stadium in Loughborough, England
Athletic Grounds (Blackpool), demolished ground in Blackpool, England, also known as Stanley Park
Athletic Grounds, Rochdale, demolished stadium in Rochdale, Greater Manchester, England
Athletic Grounds, Philadelphia, a baseball park of the 1860s

See also
Stadium